Xylotoles traversii is a species of beetle in the family Cerambycidae. It was described by Pascoe in 1876. It is known from New Zealand.

References

Dorcadiini
Beetles described in 1876